Vahidin-Nino Pršeš (born in Sarajevo, Bosnia-Herzegovina, Yugoslavia) is a Bosnian singer.  Upon completion of Music High School he continued to pursue his studies at the Sarajevo Music Academy , Department of Music Theory and Pedagogy.

Nino Pršeš has performed as a keyboardist with many pop and rock bands and has cooperated with many performers from Bosnia and Herzegovina arranging compositions for them. He is greatly inspired by ethno music. 

In 2001, he released his first solo album "Ženi se" (Get Married). Several songs from this album became hits and have been played on numerous radio and TV programs.

Nino Pršeš wrote, composed and performed the song Hano at the Eurovision Song Contest 2001. He reached a 14th place.

He has lived in Slovenia between 2008 and 2011 as music producer and production director.

Recently, he became a technician in region Novi Grad Sarajevo, and currently plays film projections in the digital cinema "Novi Grad".

Albums
 Ženi se
 1/1
 Rum-pum

References

Bosnia and Herzegovina musicians
Eurovision Song Contest entrants for Bosnia and Herzegovina
Eurovision Song Contest entrants of 2001
Singers from Sarajevo
Living people
Date of birth missing (living people)
Year of birth missing (living people)